Wheelchair fencing at the 1984 Summer Paralympics consisted of fifteen events, eleven for men and four for women.

Medal summary

Men's events

Women's events

References 

 

1984 Summer Paralympics events
1984
Paralympics
International fencing competitions hosted by the United States